The Taiwan Oil Field Exhibition Hall or Taiwan Petroleum Exhibition Hall is a museum about oil in Gongguan Township, Miaoli County, Taiwan.

History
The museum was established in 1981 by CPC Corporation in the area where oil was first discovered in Taiwan.

Exhibition
The hall houses the exhibition pavilions on the development of petroleum industry in Taiwan, from literature recording excavation, drilling and natural gas work.

See also

 List of museums in Taiwan
 Mining in Taiwan

References

External links

  

1981 establishments in Taiwan
Industry museums in Taiwan
Museums established in 1981
Museums in Miaoli County
Petroleum in Taiwan
Petroleum museums